Gonystylus affinis is a tree in the family Thymelaeaceae.

Description
The bark is reddish brown.

Distribution and habitat
Gonystylus affinis is native to Peninsular Malaysia and Borneo. Its habitat is lowland forests to  altitude.

Conservation
Gonystylus affinis has been assessed as vulnerable on the IUCN Red List. The species is threatened by logging, insufficient replanting and habitat loss to palm oil plantations. In Indonesia, the species is threatened by increasing frequency of fires.

References

affinis
Trees of Peninsular Malaysia
Trees of Borneo
Plants described in 1886